Ştefan Zoller (August 27, 1914 – October 21, 1993) was a Romanian field handball player of German ethnicity who competed in the 1936 Summer Olympics. He was part of the Romanian field handball team, which finished fifth in the Olympic tournament. He played two matches as goalkeeper.

References 
 Ştefan Zoller Biography and Olympic Results | Olympics at Sports-Reference.com

1914 births
1993 deaths
Field handball players at the 1936 Summer Olympics
Olympic handball players of Romania
Romanian male handball players